The Expanding Universe of Ashley Garcia (also known as Ashley Garcia: Genius in Love) is an American comedy television series created by Mario Lopez and Seth Kurland that premiered via streaming on Netflix on February 17, 2020. The second part of the first season was released on July 20, 2020. In August 2020, the series was canceled after one season, and the series ended with a Christmas special that was released on December 9, 2020.

Premise
The Expanding Universe of Ashley Garcia (also called Ashley Garcia: Genius in Love) follows a prodigy named Ashley Garcia, the "only 15-and-a-half-year-old robotics engineer and rocket scientist" in the world who moves in with her Uncle Victor from the other side of the country for a chance to work for NASA.

Cast and characters

Main

 Paulina Chávez as Ashley Garcia, the youngest robotics engineer and rocket scientist at Jet Propulsion Laboratory (JPL) who also has PhDs in Robotics and Applied Mathematics
 Conor Husting as Tad Cameron, the captain of football team at Crown City High School and Ashley's love interest
 Bella Podaras as Brooke Bishop, Ashley's childhood best friend and Stick's girlfriend.
 Reed Horstmann as Stick Goldstein, the equipment manager of the Crown City High School football team and Brooke's boyfriend.
 Jencarlos Canela as Victor Garcia, Ashley's uncle, the football coach at Crown City High School, and co-owner of a coffeehouse named Pat's. He was a former American football placekicker for the Dallas Cowboys.

Recurring

 Mario Lopez as Nico, Victor's friend and the co-owner of Pat's
 Haley Pullos as Bella Schmerz, Tad's on-and-off girlfriend
 Chelsea Kane as Ava Germaine, Ashley's best friend from MIT and Victor's love interest

Production

Development
On May 23, 2019, it was announced that Netflix had given the production a straight-to-series order for a first season consisting of sixteen episodes. The series was created by Mario Lopez who was also expected to executive produce alongside Seth Kurland and David Kendall. On July 30, 2019, it was reported that Jody Margolin Hahn is set to direct the pilot and several other episodes. The series was released on February 17, 2020. The second part of the first season was released on July 20, 2020. On August 31, 2020, Netflix opted not to order a second season for the series, but will end the series with a Christmas special that was released on December 9, 2020.

Casting
Alongside the initial series announcement, it was reported that Paulina Chávez and Jencarlos Canela had been cast in series regular roles.

Filming
The series was filmed at Sunset Bronson Studios in Hollywood, California, but it is set in Pasadena, California.

Episodes

Christmas Special (2020)

References

External links 

2020 American television series debuts
2020 American television series endings
2020s American comedy television series
Hispanic and Latino American television
English-language Netflix original programming
Television series about teenagers
Television shows set in Pasadena, California